Chitosanase is an enzyme with systematic name chitosan N-acetylglucosaminohydrolase. This enzyme catalyses the following chemical reaction

 Endohydrolysis of beta-(1->4)-linkages between D-glucosamine residues in a partly acetylated chitosan

A whole spectrum of chitosanases are known.

References

External links 
 

EC 3.2.1